Neocalyptis ladakhana is a species of moth of the family Tortricidae. It is found in India (Jammu and Kashmir).

The ground colour of the forewings is yellow-brown, strigulated with brown. The markings are brown. The hindwings are pale grey-brown.

References

External links

Moths described in 2006
Moths of Asia
Neocalyptis
Taxa named by Józef Razowski